Chi-ming Hou (3 December 192422 August 1991) was an American economist.

Biography
Hou was born on December 3, 1924, in Hebei, China. He obtained a bachelor's degree in law from Fu Jen Catholic University in 1945, a Master of Arts degree from the University of Oregon in 1949, a Ph.D. from Columbia University in 1954.

Since 1956, he has successively served a faculty, Charles A. Dana Professor, Head of Economics Department, Director of Division Social Superior at Colgate University, Hamilton, New York. He is also a Research professor at Brookings Institution (1965-1966) and a Research fellow in Chinese economics studies at Harvard University (1959-1962).

He was a Fulbright Lecturer in Taiwan in 1970-1971. Since 1981 he became a Visiting Senior Research Fellow of Chung-Hua Institution for Economic Research.

Contributions and recognition
Hou's representative work is Foreign Investment Economic Development in China 1840-1937, he has been listed as a noteworthy Economics educator by Marquis Who's Who. In addition, he worked with Sho-Chieh Tsiang and Tzong-Shian Yu to study Taiwan's industrial upgrading, and has also cooperated with Lin Chuan and others to study the feasibility of establishing public and railway transportation funds in Taiwan.

Member, American Economics Association (AEA).
Member, Association for Asian Studies (AAS).

See also
Sho-Chieh Tsiang
Lin Chuan

External links
Chi-Ming Hou | American Enterprise Institute - AEI
Foreign Investment and Economic Development in China, 1840-1937 — Chi-ming Hou | Harvard University Press

References

American economists
Catholic University of Peking alumni
University of Oregon alumni
Columbia University alumni
Colgate University faculty
Harvard University faculty
1924 births
1991 deaths
Chinese emigrants to the United States